The Union of Utrecht was a treaty signed on 23 January 1579 in Utrecht, Netherlands, unifying the northern provinces of the Netherlands, until then under the control of Habsburg Spain.

History
The Union of Utrecht is regarded as the foundation of the Republic of the Seven United Provinces, which was not recognized by the Spanish Empire until the Twelve Years' Truce in 1609.

The treaty was signed on 23 January by Holland, Zeeland, Utrecht (but not all of Utrecht), and the province (but not the city) of Groningen. The treaty was a reaction of the Protestant provinces to the 1579 Union of Arras (Dutch: Unie van Atrecht), in which two southern provinces and a city declared their support for Roman Catholic Spain.

During the following months of 1579, other states signed the treaty as well, such as Ghent, cities from Friesland, as well as three of the quarters of Guelders (Nijmegen Quarter, Veluwe Quarter, Zutphen County). In the summer of 1579, Amersfoort from the province of Utrecht also joined, together with Ypres, Antwerp, Breda and Brussels. In February 1580, Lier, Bruges and the surrounding area also signed the treaty. The city of Groningen shifted in favor under influence of the stadtholder for Friesland, George van Rennenberg, and also signed the treaty. The fourth quarter of Guelders, Upper Guelders, never signed the treaty. In April 1580, Overijssel and Drenthe signed on.

The parts of the Low Countries that joined:
 the County of Holland
 the County of Zeeland
 the Lordship of Utrecht
 the Duchy of Guelders
 the Lordship of Groningen
 the Lordship of Friesland
 the County of Drenthe
 the Lordship of Overijssel
 the Duchy of Brabant
 the County of Flanders
 the cities of Tournai and Valenciennes

Antwerp was the capital of the union until its fall to the Spanish.

Flanders was almost entirely conquered by the Spanish troops, as was half of Brabant. The United Provinces still recognized Spanish rule after the Union of Utrecht. However, the union contributed to the deterioration in the relationship between the provinces and their lord, and in 1581 the United Provinces declared their independence of the king in the Act of Abjuration.

The Twelve Years' Truce of 1609 marked a pause in what became known as the Eighty Years' War, effectively acknowledging Dutch independence. As Pieter Geyl puts it, the truce marked "an astonishing victory for the Dutch," who surrended no lands and did not agree to halt their attacks on Spanish colonies and the Spanish trade empire. In return the Spanish granted the United Provinces de facto independence by describing them as "Free lands, provinces and states against whom they make no claim" for the duration of the truce.

Religious tolerance

The Union of Utrecht allowed complete personal freedom of religion and was thus one of the first unlimited edicts of religious toleration. An additional declaration allowed provinces and cities that wished to remain Roman Catholic to join the union.

See also
 Dutch Revolt
 List of treaties

References

Further reading
 
 Israel, Jonathan I. The Dutch Republic: Its Rise, Greatness, and Fall 1477–1806 (1998) pp 184–96
 Koenigsberger, H. G. Monarchies, States Generals & Parliaments: The Netherlands in the Fifteenth & Sixteenth Centuries (2002) 
   Salmon, Lucy Maynard. The Union of Utrecht (1894) online pp 137–48

External links
Text of Treaty in English translation

1579 in the Habsburg Netherlands

Treaties of Flanders
Eighty Years' War (1566–1609)
Former polities in the Netherlands
Political charters
1579 establishments in Europe
History of Utrecht (city)
1579 treaties
Edicts of toleration